Steve Booras (born April 29, 1948) was an American and Canadian football player who played for the Montreal Alouettes and Memphis Southmen. He won the Grey Cup with them in 1970. He previously played football at Colorado Mesa University.

References

1948 births
Living people
Montreal Alouettes players
Memphis Southmen players
Canadian football defensive linemen
American football defensive ends
Colorado Mesa Mavericks football players
Players of American football from Montana
Sportspeople from Billings, Montana
American players of Canadian football